Skaven may refer to:
Skaven (Warhammer), a race of man-sized anthropomorphic rat creatures in Games Workshop's Warhammer Fantasy setting
Peter Hajba (Skaven), a Finnish composer and graphics designer